Róbson Xavier Valim Schuelter (born May 19, 1986 in Pedro Osório, known as Xabier Robson, is a Brazilian footballer.

Teams
  Peñarol 2008
  Atenas de San Carlos (Loan) 2009
  Peñarol 2009-2010
  Tacuarembó 2010–2012
  Pelotas 2012

Titles
  Peñarol 2009-2010 (Torneo Apertura and Uruguayan League)

References
 

1986 births
Living people
Brazilian footballers
Brazilian expatriate footballers
Atenas de San Carlos players
Tacuarembó F.C. players
Peñarol players
Expatriate footballers in Uruguay
Association football forwards